The 1993–94 EHF Women's Champions League was the first edition of the European Champions Cup, the premier European women's club handball tournament, being organized by the European Handball Federation. The competition was renamed EHF Champions League and the format of the football 1991–92 European Cup and 1992–93 UEFA Champions League was adopted.

This inaugural edition of the Champions League was won by Hypo Niederösterreich in a replay of the previous season's final match against Vasas Budapest. It was their third European Cup in a row.

First round

Eight-Finals

Champions League

Group A

Group B

Final

|}

References
   European Handball Federation

Women's EHF Champions League
Ehf Women's Champions League, 1993-94
Ehf Women's Champions League, 1993-94
EHF
EHF